Bektemir is one of 12 districts (tuman) of Tashkent, the capital of Uzbekistan.

Overview
The district was established in 1981 and lies in the south-eastern suburban area of Tashkent. It is the least-populated tuman of the city. In 2020 it lost 2.67 km2 to the new district Yangihayot.

It borders with the districts of Sergeli, Mirobod and Hamza. It borders also with Tashkent Region.

References

External links

Districts of Tashkent
Populated places established in 1981
1981 establishments in the Soviet Union